Smoked Out, Loced Out is the first mixtape and first release by American hip hop group Three 6 Mafia (then known as Triple 6 Mafia). The mixtape served as a precursor to the group's debut album, Mystic Stylez, which would be released six months later.

Track listing 

 All songs are produced by DJ Paul and Juicy J

References

Three 6 Mafia albums
Albums produced by DJ Paul
Albums produced by Juicy J